Arianism is a Christological doctrine first attributed to Arius, a Christian presbyter from Alexandria, Egypt. Arian theology holds that Jesus Christ is the Son of God, who was begotten by God the Father with the difference that the Son of God did not always exist but was begotten/made before "time" by God the Father, therefore Jesus was not coeternal with God the Father, and the difference that Arius believed the Son to be "God" only in name.

Arius' trinitarian theology, later given an extreme form by Aetius and his disciple Eunomius and called anomoean ("dissimilar"), asserts a total dissimilarity between the Son and the Father. Arianism holds that the Son is distinct from the Father and therefore subordinate to him. The term Arian is derived from the name Arius; it was not what the followers of Arius' teachings called themselves, but rather a term used by outsiders. The nature of Arius's teachings and his supporters were opposed to the theological doctrines held by Homoousian Christians, regarding the nature of the Trinity and the nature of Christ.

There was a controversy between two interpretations of Jesus's divinity (Homoousianism and Arianism) based upon the theological orthodoxy of the time, one trinitarian and the other also a derivative of trinitarian orthodoxy, and both of them attempted to solve its respective theological dilemmas. Homoousianism was formally affirmed by the first two ecumenical councils; since then, Arianism has always been condemned as "the heresy or sect of Arius". As such, all mainstream branches of Christianity now consider Arianism to be heterodox and heretical. Trinitarian (Homoousian) doctrines were vigorously upheld by Patriarch Athanasius of Alexandria, who insisted that Jesus (God the Son) was "same in being" or "same in essence" with God the Father. Arius stated: "If the Father begat the Son, then he who was begotten had a beginning in existence, and from this it follows there was a time when the Son was not." The ecumenical First Council of Nicaea of 325, convened by Emperor Constantine to ensure church unity, declared Arianism to be a heresy. According to Everett Ferguson, "The great majority of Christians had no clear views about the nature of the Trinity and they did not understand what was at stake in the issues that surrounded it."

Arianism is also used to refer to other nontrinitarian theological systems of the 4th century, which regarded Jesus Christ—the Son of God, the Logos—as either a begotten creature of a similar or different substance to that of the Father, but not identical (as Homoiousian and Anomoeanism) or as neither uncreated nor created in the sense other beings are created (as in semi-Arianism).

Origin

Controversy over Arianism arose in the late 3rd century and persisted throughout most of the 4th century. It involved most church members—from simple believers, priests, and monks to bishops, emperors, and members of Rome's imperial family. Two Roman emperors, Constantius II and Valens, became Arians or Semi-Arians, as did prominent Gothic, Vandal, and Lombard warlords both before and after the fall of the Western Roman Empire. Such a deep controversy within the early Church during this period of its development could not have materialized without significant historical influences providing a basis for the Arian doctrines.

Arius had been a pupil of Lucian of Antioch at Lucian's private academy in Antioch and inherited from him a modified form of the teachings of Paul of Samosata. Arius taught that God the Father and the Son of God did not always exist together eternally.

Condemnation by the Council of Nicaea 
Emperor Constantine the Great summoned the First Council of Nicaea, which defined the dogmatic fundaments of Christianity; these definitions served to rebut the questions posed by Arians. All the bishops who were there were in agreement with the major theological points of the proto-orthodoxy, since at that time all other forms of Christianity "had by this time already been displaced, suppressed, reformed, or destroyed". Although the proto-orthodox won the previous disputes, due to the more accurate defining of orthodoxy, they were vanquished with their own weapons, ultimately being declared heretics, not because they would have fought against ideas regarded as theologically correct, but because their positions lacked the accuracy and refinement needed by the fusion of several contradictory theses accepted at the same time by later orthodox theologians. According to Bart Ehrman that is why the Trinity is a "paradoxical affirmation".

Of the roughly 300 bishops in attendance at the Council of Nicaea, two bishops did not sign the Nicene Creed that condemned Arianism. Constantine the Great also ordered a penalty of death for those who refused to surrender the Arian writings:

Ten years after the Council of Nicaea, Constantine the Great, who was himself later baptized by the Arian bishop Eusebius of Nicomedia in 337 AD, convened another gathering of church leaders at the regional First Synod of Tyre in 335 (attended by 310 bishops), to address various charges mounted against Athanasius by his detractors, such as "murder, illegal taxation, sorcery, and treason", following his refusal to readmit Arius into fellowship. Athanasius was exiled to Trier (in modern Germany) following his conviction at Tyre of conspiracy, and Arius was, effectively, exonerated. Athanasius eventually returned to Alexandria in 346, after the deaths of both Arius and Constantine. Though Arianism had spread, Athanasius and other Nicene Christian church leaders crusaded against Arian theology, and Arius was anathemised and condemned as a heretic once more at the ecumenical First Council of Constantinople of 381 (attended by 150 bishops). The Roman Emperors Constantius II (337–361) and Valens (364–378) were Arians or Semi-Arians, as was the first King of Italy, Odoacer (433?–493), and the Lombards were also Arians or Semi-Arians until the 7th century. The ruling elite of Visigothic Spain was Arian until 589. Many Goths adopted Arian beliefs upon their conversion to Christianity. The Vandals actively spread Arianism in North Africa.

Beliefs
Little of Arius's own work survives except in quotations selected for polemical purposes by his opponents, and there is no certainty about what theological and philosophical traditions formed his thought.

Arianism taught that the Logos was a divine being begotten by God the Father before the creation of the world, made him a medium through whom everything else was created, and that the Son of God is subordinate to God the Father. A verse from Proverbs was also used: "The Lord created me at the beginning of his work." Therefore, the Son was rather the very first and the most perfect of God's creatures, and he was made "God" only by the Father's permission and power.

Arians do not believe in the traditional doctrine of the Trinity. The letter of the Arian bishop Auxentius of Durostorum regarding the Arian missionary Ulfilas gives a picture of Arian beliefs. The Arian Ulfilas, who was ordained a bishop by the Arian bishop Eusebius of Nicomedia and returned to his people to work as a missionary, believed: God, the Father, ("unbegotten" God; Almighty God) always existing and who is the only true God. The Son of God, Jesus Christ, ("only-begotten God"), Mighty God; begotten before time began,  and who is Lord/Master. The Holy Spirit (the illuminating and sanctifying power, who is neither God the Father nor Lord/Master). 1 Corinthians 8:5–6 was cited as proof text:

The creed of Arian Ulfilas (c. 311–383), which concludes the above-mentioned letter by Auxentius, distinguishes God the Father ("unbegotten"), who is the only true God, from Son of God ("only-begotten"), who is Lord/Master; and the Holy Spirit, the illuminating and sanctifying power, who is neither God the Father nor Lord/Master:

A letter from Arius (c. 250–336) to the Arian Eusebius of Nicomedia (died 341) states the core beliefs of the Arians:

Principally, the dispute between Trinitarianism and Arianism was about:
 has the Son always existed eternally with the Father or was the Son begotten at a certain time in the past?
 is the Son equal to the Father or subordinated to the Father?

For Constantine, these were minor theological points that stood in the way of uniting the Empire, but for the theologians, it was of huge importance; for them, it was a matter of salvation.

For the theologians of the 19th century it was already obvious that in fact Arius and Alexander/Athanasius did not have much to quarrel about, the difference between their views was very small, and that the end of the fight was by no means clear during their quarrel, both Arius and Athanasius suffering a great deal for their own views. Arius was the father of Homoiousianism and Alexander the father of Homoousianism, which was championed by Athanasius. For those theologians it was clear that Arius, Alexander and Athanasius were far from a true doctrine of Trinity, which developed later, historically speaking.

Guido M. Berndt and Roland Steinacher state clearly that the beliefs of Arius were acceptable ("not especially unusual") to a huge number of orthodox clergy; this is the reason why such a major conflict was able to develop inside the Church, since Arius's theology received widespread sympathy (or at least was not considered to be overly controversial) and could not be dismissed outright as individual heresy.

Homoian Arianism
Arianism had several different variants, including Eunomianism and Homoian Arianism. Homoian Arianism is associated with Acacius and Eudoxius. Homoian Arianism avoided the use of the word ousia to describe the relation of Father to Son, and described these as "like" each other. Hanson lists twelve creeds that reflect the Homoian faith:
 The Second Sirmian Creed of 357
 The Creed of Nice (Constantinople) 360
 The creed put forward by Acacius at Seleucia, 359
 The Rule of Faith of Ulfilas
 The creed uttered by Ulfilas on his deathbed, 383
 The creed attributed to Eudoxius
 The Creed of Auxentius of Milan, 364
 The Creed of Germinius professed in correspondence with Ursacius of Singidunum and Valens of Mursa
 Palladius's rule of faith
 Three credal statements found in fragments, subordinating the Son to the Father

Struggles with orthodoxy

First Council of Nicaea

In 321, Arius was denounced by a synod at Alexandria for teaching a heterodox view of the relationship of Jesus to God the Father. Because Arius and his followers had great influence in the schools of Alexandria—counterparts to modern universities or seminaries—their theological views spread, especially in the eastern Mediterranean.

By 325, the controversy had become significant enough that the Emperor Constantine called an assembly of bishops, the First Council of Nicaea, which condemned Arius's doctrine and formulated the original Nicene Creed of 325. The Nicene Creed's central term, used to describe the relationship between the Father and the Son, is Homoousios, or Consubstantiality, meaning "of the same substance" or "of one being" (the Athanasian Creed is less often used but is a more overtly anti-Arian statement on the Trinity).

The focus of the Council of Nicaea was the nature of the Son of God and his precise relationship to God the Father (see Paul of Samosata and the Synods of Antioch). Arius taught that Jesus Christ was divine/holy and was sent to earth for the salvation of mankind but that Jesus Christ was not equal to God the Father (infinite, primordial origin) in rank and that God the Father and the Son of God were not equal to the Holy Spirit. Under Arianism, Christ was instead not consubstantial with God the Father since both the Father and the Son under Arius were made of "like" essence or being (see homoiousia) but not of the same essence or being (see homoousia).

In the Arian view, God the Father is a deity and is divine and the Son of God is not a deity but divine (I, the LORD, am Deity alone.) God the Father sent Jesus to earth for salvation of mankind. Ousia is essence or being, in Eastern Christianity, and is the aspect of God that is completely incomprehensible to mankind and human perception. It is all that subsists by itself and which has not its being in another, God the Father and God the Son and God the Holy Spirit all being uncreated.

According to the teaching of Arius, the preexistent Logos and thus the incarnate Jesus Christ was a begotten being; only the Son was directly begotten by God the Father, before ages, but was of a distinct, though similar, essence or substance from the Creator. His opponents argued that this would make Jesus less than God and that this was heretical. Much of the distinction between the differing factions was over the phrasing that Christ expressed in the New Testament to express submission to God the Father. The theological term for this submission is kenosis. This ecumenical council declared that Jesus Christ was true God, co-eternal and consubstantial (i.e., of the same substance) with God the Father.

Constantine is believed to have exiled those who refused to accept the Nicaean Creed—Arius himself, the deacon Euzoios, and the Libyan bishops Theonas of Marmarica and Secundus of Ptolemais—and also the bishops who signed the creed but refused to join in condemnation of Arius, Eusebius of Nicomedia and Theognis of Nicaea. The emperor also ordered all copies of the Thalia, the book in which Arius had expressed his teachings, to be burned. However, there is no evidence that his son and ultimate successor, Constantius II, who was a Semi-Arian Christian, was exiled.

Although he was committed to maintaining what the Great Church had defined at Nicaea, Constantine was also bent on pacifying the situation and eventually became more lenient toward those condemned and exiled at the council. First, he allowed Eusebius of Nicomedia, who was a protégé of his sister, and Theognis to return once they had signed an ambiguous statement of faith. The two, and other friends of Arius, worked for Arius's rehabilitation.

At the First Synod of Tyre in AD 335, they brought accusations against Athanasius, now bishop of Alexandria, the primary opponent of Arius. After this, Constantine had Athanasius banished since he considered him an impediment to reconciliation. In the same year, the Synod of Jerusalem under Constantine's direction readmitted Arius to communion in 336. Arius died on the way to this event in Constantinople. Some scholars suggest that Arius may have been poisoned by his opponents. Eusebius and Theognis remained in the Emperor's favor, and when Constantine, who had been a catechumen much of his adult life, accepted baptism on his deathbed, it was from Eusebius of Nicomedia.

Aftermath of Nicaea

The First Council of Nicaea did not end the controversy, as many bishops of the Eastern provinces disputed the homoousios, the central term of the Nicene Creed, as it had been used by Paul of Samosata, who had advocated a monarchianist Christology. Both the man and his teaching, including the term homoousios, had been condemned by the Synods of Antioch in 269.
Hence, after Constantine's death in 337, open dispute resumed again. Constantine's son Constantius II, who had become emperor of the eastern part of the Roman Empire, actually encouraged the Arians and set out to reverse the Nicene Creed. His advisor in these affairs was Eusebius of Nicomedia, who had already at the Council of Nicaea been the head of the Arian party, who also was made the bishop of Constantinople.

Constantius used his power to exile bishops adhering to the Nicene Creed, especially St Athanasius of Alexandria, who fled to Rome. In 355 Constantius became the sole Roman emperor and extended his pro-Arian policy toward the western provinces, frequently using force to push through his creed, even exiling Pope Liberius and installing Antipope Felix II.

The Third Council of Sirmium in 357 was the high point of Arianism. The Seventh Arian Confession (Second Sirmium Confession) held that both homoousios (of one substance) and homoiousios (of similar substance) were unbiblical and that the Father is greater than the Son. (This confession was later known as the Blasphemy of Sirmium.)

But since many persons are disturbed by questions concerning what is called in Latin substantia, but in Greek ousia, that is, to make it understood more exactly, as to 'coessential,' or what is called, 'like-in-essence,' there ought to be no mention of any of these at all, nor exposition of them in the Church, for this reason and for this consideration, that in divine Scripture nothing is written about them, and that they are above men's knowledge and above men's understanding;

As debates raged in an attempt to come up with a new formula, three camps evolved among the opponents of the Nicene Creed. The first group mainly opposed the Nicene terminology and preferred the term homoiousios (alike in substance) to the Nicene homoousios, while they rejected Arius and his teaching and accepted the equality and co-eternality of the persons of the Trinity. Because of this centrist position, and despite their rejection of Arius, they were called "Semi-Arians" by their opponents. The second group also avoided invoking the name of Arius, but in large part followed Arius's teachings and, in another attempted compromise wording, described the Son as being like (homoios) the Father. A third group explicitly called upon Arius and described the Son as unlike (anhomoios) the Father. Constantius wavered in his support between the first and the second party, while harshly persecuting the third.

Epiphanius of Salamis labeled the party of Basil of Ancyra in 358 "Semi-Arianism". This is considered unfair by Kelly who states that some members of the group were virtually orthodox from the start but disliked the adjective homoousios while others had moved in that direction after the out-and-out Arians had come into the open.

The debates among these groups resulted in numerous synods, among them the Council of Serdica in 343, the Fourth Council of Sirmium in 358 and the double Council of Rimini and Seleucia in 359, and no fewer than fourteen further creed formulas between 340 and 360, leading the pagan observer Ammianus Marcellinus to comment sarcastically: "The highways were covered with galloping bishops." None of these attempts were acceptable to the defenders of Nicene orthodoxy; writing about the latter councils, Saint Jerome remarked that the world "awoke with a groan to find itself Arian."

After Constantius's death in 361, his successor Julian, a devotee of Rome's pagan gods, declared that he would no longer attempt to favor one church faction over another, and allowed all exiled bishops to return; this resulted in further increasing dissension among Nicene Christians. The emperor Valens, however, revived Constantius's policy and supported the "Homoian" party, exiling bishops and often using force. During this persecution many bishops were exiled to the other ends of the Roman Empire (e.g., Saint Hilary of Poitiers to the eastern provinces). These contacts and the common plight subsequently led to a rapprochement between the western supporters of the Nicene Creed and the homoousios and the eastern Semi-Arians.

Council of Constantinople

It was not until the co-reigns of Gratian and Theodosius that Arianism was effectively wiped out among the ruling class and elite of the Eastern Empire. Valens died in the Battle of Adrianople in 378 and was succeeded by Theodosius I, who adhered to the Nicene Creed. This allowed for settling the dispute. Theodosius's wife St Flacilla was instrumental in his campaign to end Arianism.

Two days after Theodosius arrived in Constantinople, 24 November 380, he expelled the Homoiousian bishop, Demophilus of Constantinople, and surrendered the churches of that city to Gregory of Nazianzus, the leader of the rather small Nicene community there, an act which provoked rioting. Theodosius had just been baptized, by bishop Acholius of Thessalonica, during a severe illness, as was common in the early Christian world. In February he and Gratian had published an edict that all their subjects should profess the faith of the bishops of Rome and Alexandria (i.e., the Nicene faith), or be handed over for punishment for not doing so.

Although much of the church hierarchy in the East had opposed the Nicene Creed in the decades leading up to Theodosius's accession, he managed to achieve unity on the basis of the Nicene Creed. In 381, at the Second Ecumenical Council in Constantinople, a group of mainly Eastern bishops assembled and accepted the Nicene Creed of 381, which was supplemented in regard to the Holy Spirit, as well as some other changes: see Comparison of Nicene Creeds of 325 and 381. This is generally considered the end of the dispute about the Trinity and the end of Arianism among the Roman, non-Germanic peoples.

Among medieval Germanic tribes

During the time of Arianism's flowering in Constantinople, the Gothic convert and Arian bishop Ulfilas (later the subject of the letter of Auxentius cited above) was sent as a missionary to the Gothic tribes across the Danube, a mission favored for political reasons by the Emperor Constantius II. The Homoians in the Danubian provinces played a major role in the conversion of the Goths to Arianism. Ulfilas's translation of the Bible into Gothic language and his initial success in converting the Goths to Arianism was strengthened by later events; the conversion of Goths led to a widespread diffusion of Arianism among other Germanic tribes as well (Vandals, Langobards, Svevi, and Burgundians). When the Germanic peoples entered the provinces of the Western Roman Empire and began founding their own kingdoms there, most of them were Arian Christians.

The conflict in the 4th century had seen Arian and Nicene factions struggling for control of Western Europe. In contrast, among the Arian German kingdoms established in the collapsing Western Empire in the 5th century were entirely separate Arian and Nicene Churches with parallel hierarchies, each serving different sets of believers. The Germanic elites were Arians, and the Romance majority population was Nicene.

The Arian Germanic tribes were generally tolerant towards Nicene Christians and other religious minorities, including the Jews. However, the Vandals tried for several decades to force their Arian beliefs on their North African Nicene subjects, exiling Nicene clergy, dissolving monasteries, and exercising heavy pressure on non-conforming Nicene Christians.

The apparent resurgence of Arianism after Nicaea was more an anti-Nicene reaction exploited by Arian sympathizers than a pro-Arian development. By the end of the 4th century it had surrendered its remaining ground to Trinitarianism. In Western Europe, Arianism, which had been taught by Ulfilas, the Arian missionary to the Germanic tribes, was dominant among the Goths, Langobards and Vandals. By the 8th century, it had ceased to be the tribes' mainstream belief as the tribal rulers gradually came to adopt Nicene orthodoxy. This trend began in 496 with Clovis I of the Franks, then Reccared I of the Visigoths in 587 and Aripert I of the Lombards in 653.

The Franks and the Anglo-Saxons were unlike the other Germanic peoples in that they entered the Western Roman Empire as Pagans and were converted to Chalcedonian Christianity, led by their kings, Clovis I of the Franks, and Æthelberht of Kent and others in Britain (see also Christianity in Gaul and Christianisation of Anglo-Saxon England). The remaining tribes – the Vandals and the Ostrogoths – did not convert as a people nor did they maintain territorial cohesion. Having been militarily defeated by the armies of Emperor Justinian I, the remnants were dispersed to the fringes of the empire and became lost to history. The Vandalic War of 533–534 dispersed the defeated Vandals. Following their final defeat at the Battle of Mons Lactarius in 553, the Ostrogoths went back north and (re)settled in south Austria.

From the 5th to the 7th century
Much of south-eastern Europe and central Europe, including many of the Goths and Vandals respectively, had embraced Arianism (the Visigoths converted to Arian Christianity in 376 through their bishop Wulfila), which led to Arianism being a religious factor in various wars in the Roman Empire. In the west, organized Arianism survived in North Africa, in Hispania, and parts of Italy until it was finally suppressed in the 6th and 7th centuries. Visigothic Spain converted to Nicene Christianity through their king Reccared I at the Third Council of Toledo in 589. Grimoald, King of the Lombards (662–671), and his young son and successor Garibald (671), were the last Arian kings in Europe.

From the 16th to the 19th century
Following the Protestant Reformation from 1517, it did not take long for Arian and other nontrinitarian views to resurface. The first recorded English antitrinitarian was John Assheton, who was forced to recant before Thomas Cranmer in 1548. At the Anabaptist Council of Venice 1550, the early Italian instigators of the Radical Reformation committed to the views of Michael Servetus, who was burned alive by the orders of John Calvin in 1553, and these were promulgated by Giorgio Biandrata and others into Poland and Transylvania.

The antitrinitarian wing of the Polish Reformation separated from the Calvinist ecclesia maior to form the ecclesia minor or Polish Brethren. These were commonly referred to as "Arians" due to their rejection of the Trinity, though in fact the Socinians, as they were later known, went further than Arius to the position of Photinus. The epithet "Arian" was also applied to the early Unitarians such as John Biddle, though in denial of the pre-existence of Christ they were again largely Socinians, not Arians.

In 1683, when Anthony Ashley Cooper, 1st Earl of Shaftesbury, lay dying in Amsterdam—driven into exile by his outspoken opposition to King Charles II—he spoke to the minister Robert Ferguson, and professed himself an Arian.

In the 18th century the "dominant trend" in Britain, particularly in Latitudinarianism, was towards Arianism, with which the names of Samuel Clarke, Benjamin Hoadly, William Whiston and Isaac Newton are associated. To quote the Encyclopædia Britannica article on Arianism: "In modern times some Unitarians are virtually Arians in that they are unwilling either to reduce Christ to a mere human being or to attribute to him a divine nature identical with that of the Father."

A similar view was held by the ancient anti-Nicene Pneumatomachi (Greek: , "breath" or "spirit" and "fighters", combining as "fighters against the spirit"), so called because they opposed the deifying of the Nicene Holy Ghost. Although the Pneumatomachi's beliefs were somewhat reminiscent of Arianism, they were a distinct group.

Today 

The teachings of the first two ecumenical councils—which entirely reject Arianism—are held by the Catholic Church, the Eastern Orthodox Church, the Oriental Orthodox Churches, the Assyrian Church of the East and most churches founded during the Reformation in the 16th century or influenced by it (Lutheran, Reformed/Presbyterian, and Anglican). Also, nearly all Protestant groups (such as Methodists, Baptists, Evangelicals and most Pentecostals) entirely reject the teachings associated with Arianism. Modern groups which currently appear to embrace some of the principles of Arianism include Unitarians and Jehovah's Witnesses. Although the origins of their beliefs are not necessarily attributed to the teachings of Arius, many of the core beliefs of Unitarians and Jehovah's Witnesses are very similar to them.

The Church of Jesus Christ of Latter-day Saints

The doctrine of the Church of Jesus Christ of Latter-day Saints (LDS Church) concerning the nature of the Godhead teaches a nontrinitarian theology. The church's first Article of Faith states: "We believe in God, the Eternal Father, and in His Son, Jesus Christ, and in the Holy Ghost," while the 130th section of the Doctrine and Covenants explains that "The Father has a body of flesh and bones as tangible as man's; the Son also; but the Holy Ghost has not a body of flesh and bones, but is a personage of Spirit. Were it not so, the Holy Ghost could not dwell in us."

Similarities between LDS doctrines and Arianism were noted as early as 1846. There are, however, a number of key differences between Arianism and Latter-day Saint theology, including the co-eternality of Jesus Christ and the Holy Ghost with the Father. Latter-day Saints deny any form of creation ex nihilo, whereas creation ex nihilo and Christ's created and inferior nature are fundamental premises of Arianism. Arianism also teaches that Christ's existence is contingent on the Father, and that he is ontologically subordinate to the Father. Both of these premises are rejected by Latter-day Saint doctrine. Conversely, the LDS Church teaches that Christ is equal in nature, power, and glory with the Father, having perfectly subordinated his will to the Father's. In turn, the Father is understood to have his power by virtue of his own perfect character and subordination to eternal and uncreated principles of righteousness. The Book of Mormon prophet Alma summarizes this by saying that were God not to be perfectly just, then "God would cease to be God". Thus, Christ's subordination to the Father's will is understood as subordination to those same eternal and uncreated principles of righteousness through perfectly emulating the Father's character and example.

The LDS Church teaches that this view of the Godhead is the doctrine taught by Jesus Christ and other ancient prophets, and, by extension, that taught by the scriptures now compiled as the Bible and the Book of Mormon. Thus, Latter-day Saint doctrine does not accept the Nicene definition of Trinity (that the three are consubstantial) nor agree with the Athanasian statement that God and Christ are incomprehensible. In contrast, the Church teaches that the Biblical doctrine is self-evident: "the Father, the Son and the Holy Spirit (or Holy Ghost)... are three physically separate beings, but fully one in love, purpose and will", as illustrated in the Farewell Prayer of Jesus, his baptism at the hands of John, his transfiguration, and the martyrdom of Stephen.

Jehovah's Witnesses

Jehovah's Witnesses are often referred to as "modern-day Arians" or they are sometimes referred to as "semi-Arians", usually by their opponents, although Jehovah's Witnesses themselves have denied these claims. While there are some significant similarities in matters of doctrine, Jehovah's Witnesses differ from Arians by stating that the Son can fully know the Father (something which Arius himself denied), and by their denial of personality to the Holy Spirit. The original Arians also generally prayed directly to Jesus, whereas Jehovah's Witnesses exclusively worship and pray to Jehovah God (God the Father) only through Jesus the son as a mediator.

Iglesia ni Cristo 

The Iglesia ni Cristo's christology has parallels with Arianism in that it affirms Jesus's pre-existence, but holds that he was sanctified and given his holiness by the Father, who they hold to be the only true God.

Others
Other groups which oppose the belief in the Trinity are not Arian.
 Other Biblical Unitarians such as the Christadelphians and Church of God General Conference are typically Socinian rather than Arian in their Christology.
The Gospel Assemblies, a group of Pentecostal, non-denominational churches which believe that only the Father has inherent immortality, but that the Son has received immortality from the Father, and that the Holy Spirit is not a distinct person with distinct intelligence, but rather the life and presence of God the Father and his Son. The Godhead comprises two distinct persons.
 There are also various binitarian churches which believe that God is two persons: the Father and the Son, and that the Holy Spirit is not a person. These include the Church of God (Seventh Day) and its various offshoots. One offshoot in particular, Radio Church of God (founded by Herbert W. Armstrong and renamed Worldwide Church of God), was originally Binitarian, but converted to Trinitarianism after Armstrong's death. That conversion prompted the formation of many small breakaway churches which retained Binitarian beliefs, such as Restored Church of God, United Church of God, Philadelphia Church of God, and Living Church of God. Other Binitarian churches include the Church of Jesus Christ (Bickertonite), an offshoot of Mormonism, which believes that God is two personages, not two persons. Binitarian churches generally believe that the Father is greater than the Son, a view somewhat similar to Arianism.

See also

References

Notes

Citations

Sources

Further reading

External links

 Documents of the Early Arian Controversy Chronological survey of the sources
 English translations of all extant letters relating to early Arianism
 A map of early sympathizers with Arius
 
 Jewish Encyclopedia: Arianism
 Concordia Cyclopedia: Arianism (page 1) (page 2) (page 3)
 
 The Arians of the fourth century by John Henry "Cardinal" Newman in "btm" format
 Concise Summary of the Arian Controversy
 Arianism Today 

 
Christian terminology
Nontrinitarian denominations
Christian theological movements
Christian denominations established in the 3rd century
Nature of Jesus Christ